Neololeba is a tropical Asian, Australian, and Papuasian genus of bamboos in the grass family.

Species
 Neololeba amahussana (Lindl.) Widjaja – Ambon, Seram
 Neololeba atra (Lindl.) Widjaja- Philippines, Sulawesi, Maluku, New Guinea, Bismarck Archipelago, Queensland
 Neololeba glabra Widjaja – western New Guinea
 Neololeba hirsuta (Holttum) Widjaja – New Guinea
 Neololeba inaurita Widjaja – western New Guinea

References

Bambusoideae genera
Bambusoideae